Zichang is a city in the north of Shaanxi's province, China. It is the northernmost county-level division of the prefecture-level city of Yan'an. Zichang had a population of 273,000 as of 2017, of which, 115,000 lived in urban areas.

Administrative divisions
Zichang is divided into 1 subdistrict and 8 towns.

Wayaobu Subdistrict 
The city's sole subdistrict is Wayaobu Subdistrict. The subdistrict is the seat of the city's administrative offices.

Towns 
Zichang's eight towns are as follows:

 
 
 
 
 
 
 
 

Climate

History 
Formerly called Anding County, it was renamed in 1942 to Zichang County to commemorate the Communist martyr . On July 25, 2019, the province re-organized the county as a county-level city.

Economy 
In 2017, the city's GDP was valued at 9.719 billion yuan.

Agriculture 
The city's agricultural sector had an output of 1.288 billion yuan in 2017. Major crops include millet, wheat, corn, beans, and potatoes. The city's "mountain apples" and potatoes have been recognized for being of outstanding quality.

Industry 
Zichang's industry is largely dependent on natural resources such as coal and petroleum. In 2017, the city produced 11.52 million tons of raw coal and 745,000 tons of crude oil.

Transportation
The city is served by a number of road and rail links. Key roads which pass through the city include Shaanxi Provincial Road 205. The city's railway station, is served by the Baotou–Xi'an railway.

References

County-level divisions of Shaanxi
Yan'an